Chidananda Saraswati  (24 September 1916 – 28 August 2008) was President of the Divine Life Society, Rishikesh, India. He is well known in India as a yogi, dnyani and spiritual leader. He succeeded as President of the Divine Life Society in 1963, after the death of his predecessor, Sivananda Saraswati, who founded the Society.

Chidananda's birth name was Sridhar Rao. He received a Bachelor of Arts degree from Loyola College, Chennai. He took to a life of renunciation in 1936, and joined the Sivananda Ashram run by Sivananda Saraswati in Rishikesh in 1943.

He was appointed General Secretary of the Divine Life Society in 1948. He was initiated into the Sannyas order by his guru, Sivananda, on Guru Purnima day, 10 July 1949. It was then that he received his monastic name "Chidananda", which means "one who is consciousness and bliss".

He was elected President of the Divine Life Society in August 1963, upon the death of Sivananda.

Chidananda Saraswati died on 28 August 2008, at 20:11 pm.

Early life 

Sridhar Rao, (as Chidananda Saraswati was known before taking Sannyasa (embracing a life of renunciation), was born in south indian Hindu family at Mangalore, to Sri Srinivasa Rao and Sarojini, on 24 September 1916, the second of five children and the eldest son. Sri Srinivasa Rao was a prosperous Zamindar, a rich landlord owning several villages, extensive lands and palatial buildings in South India. Sarojini was an ideal Indian mother, noted for her saintliness.

At the age of eight, Sridhar Rao's life was influenced by Sri Anantayya, a friend of his grandfather, who used to relate to him stories from the epics, Ramayana and Mahābhārata. Doing Tapas (austerities), becoming a Rishi (sage), and having a vision of the Lord became ideals which he cherished.

His uncle, Krishna Rao, shielded him against the influences of the materialistic world around him, and sowed in him the seeds of the nivritti life (life of renunciation) which he joyously nurtured until, as later events proved, it blossomed into sainthood.

His elementary education began at Mangalore. In 1932, he joined the Sir M.Ct. Muthiah Chettiar Higher Secondary School in Madras, where he distinguished himself as a brilliant student. His cheerful personality, exemplary conduct, and extraordinary traits earned for him a distinct place in the hearts of all teachers and students who came into his contact.

In 1936, he was admitted to Loyola College, University of Madras, whose portals admit only the most brilliant of students. In 1938, he emerged with the degree of Bachelor of Arts.

The family was noted for its high code of conduct and this was infused into his life. Charity and service were the glorious ingrained virtues of the members of the family. These virtues found an embodiment in Sridhar Rao. He discovered ways and means of manifesting them. No one who sought his help was sent away without assistance. He gave freely to the needy.

Service, especially of the sick, often brought out the fact that he had no idea of his own separate existence as an individual. It seemed as if his body clung loosely to his soul. Nor was all this service confined to human beings. Birds and animals claimed his attention as much as, if not more than, human beings. He understood their language of suffering. His service of a sick dog evoked the admiration of his Guru, Sivananda. He would raise his finger in grim admonition when he saw anyone practicing cruelty to dumb animals in his presence.

Quite early in life, although born in a wealthy family, he shunned the pleasures of the world to devote himself to seclusion and contemplation. In the matter of study, it was the spiritual books which had the most appeal to him, more than college books. Even while he was at college, text-books had to take second place to spiritual books. The works of Ramakrishna, Swami Vivekananda, and Sivananda, took precedence over all others.

He shared his knowledge with others, so much so that he virtually became the Guru of the household and the neighborhood, to whom he would talk of honesty, love, purity, service and devotion to God. He would exhort them to perform japa of Rama-Nama. While still in his twenties, he began initiating youngsters into this great Rama Taraka Mantra. He was an ardent admirer of Sri Ramakrishna Math at Madras and regularly participated in the Satsangs (association with the wise) there. The call of Swami Vivekananda to renounce resounded within his pure heart. He ever thirsted for the darshan (meeting/s) of Saints and Sadhus (renunciate) visiting the metropolis.

In June 1936, he disappeared from home. After a vigorous search by his parents, he was found in the secluded Ashram of a holy sage some miles from the sacred mountain shrine Tirupati. He returned home after some persuasion. This temporary separation was but a preparation for the final parting from the world of attachments to family and friends.

Initiation

The final decision came in 1943. He was already in correspondence with Sivananda Saraswati. He obtained Sivananda's permission to join the Ashram.

On arriving at the Ashram, he naturally took charge of the dispensary. He became the man with the healing hand. The growing reputation of his divine healing hand attracted a rush of patients to the Sivananda Charitable Dispensary.

Very soon after joining the Ashram, he gave ample evidence of the brilliance of his intellect. He delivered lectures, wrote articles for magazines and gave spiritual instructions to the visitors. When the Yoga-Vedanta Forest University (now known as the Yoga-Vedanta Forest Academy) was established in 1948, Sivananda paid him a fitting tribute by appointing him Vice-Chancellor and Professor of Raja Yoga. During his first year he inspired the students with his brilliant exposition of Maharishi Patanjali's Yoga Sutras.

It was also in the first year of his stay at the Ashram that he wrote his magnum opus 'Light Fountain', an immortal biography of his Guru Sivananda. Sivananda once remarked: "Sivananda will pass away, but 'Light Fountain' will live".

In addition to his multifarious activities and intense Sadhana, he founded, under the guidance of Sivananda, the Yoga Museum in 1947, in which the entire philosophy of Vedanta and all the processes of Yoga Sadhana are depicted in the form of pictures and illustrations.

Towards the end of 1948, Sivananda nominated him as the General Secretary of The Divine Life Society. The great responsibility of the organization fell on his shoulders. From that very moment he spiritualized all his activities by his presence, counsel and wise leadership. He exhorted all to raise their consciousness to the level of the Divine.

On Guru Purnima day, 10 July 1949, he was initiated into the holy order of Sannyasa by Sivananda. He now became known as Chidananda, a name which connotes : "one who is consciousness and bliss".

In August 1963, after the Mahasamadhi of the Master, he was elected as President of the Divine Life Society. After election, he strove to hold aloft the banner of renunciation, dedicated service, love and spiritual idealism, not only within the set-up of the widespread organization of the Society, but in the hearts of countless seekers throughout the world, who were all too eager to seek his advice, help and guidance.

Chidananda Saraswati has toured the length and breadth of India, Malaysia and South Africa to serve the devotees of the Society.

Again in 1968, Chidananda undertook the Global Tour at the request of numerous disciples and devotees of Sivananda, and visited all countries of the world. Wherever he went, devotees received him cordially, and listened to him with rapt attention. In one of his innumerous meetings Swami Chidananda met Sri Sri Sitaramdas Omkarnathdev and declared him as Naam Avatara and said "Beloved Babaji is verily Naam Avatara. His entire life and personality is a radiant example and expression of Naam Bhakti and Naam Shakti. I bow down in silent reverence and love at his holy feet."

Chidananda Saraswati, right from the beginning worked and served the cause of Sivananda's mission tirelessly, and to spread his Divine Life message far and wide, not only in Bharatavarsha (India) but also in countries outside.  He inspired others through the practice of self-discipline.  For example, after completing a thirty-day fast while in Canada, Swami Chidananda arranged for resources to be provided to support the founding of a Sivanada Ashram in Vancouver.  He practiced a non-denominational, universal form of yoga.  He often led satsang (group chanting) that named and elevated all of the prophets and sages of all of the world religions equally (Lord Jesus, Ahura Mazda, Lord Buddha, etc.).

Books
Books by Chidananda Saraswati:

An Instrument of thy Peace
Awake, Realise your Divinity
Bhaja Govindam
Bliss is Within
Call to Liberation
Chidananda Hun
Daily Swadhyaya
Divine Vision
Eternal Messages
Essentials of Higher Values in Life
Gita Vision
God as Mother
Guide Lines to Illumination
Guide to Noble Living
Lectures on Raja Yoga
Liberation is Possible !
Light on the Yoga Way of Life
Manache Shlok (Translation)
Message of Swami Chidananda to Mankind
New Beginning
Path Beyond Sorrow
Path to Blessedness
Philosophy, Psychology and Practice of Yoga
Ponder These Truths
Practical Guide to Yoga
Renunciation—a Life of Surrender and Trust
Seek The Beyond
Swami Sivananda—Saint, Sage and Godman
The Quintessence of the Upanishad
The Role of Celibacy in Spiritual Life
The Truth That Liberates
Twenty Important Spiritual Instructions
Ultimate Journey
Verses Addressed to the Mind

References

External links
 

1916 births
2008 deaths
Indian Hindu spiritual teachers
Loyola College, Chennai alumni
People from Rishikesh
Writers from Mangalore
20th-century Hindu philosophers and theologians
Indian spiritual writers
20th-century Hindu religious leaders
20th-century Indian non-fiction writers
Indian yoga gurus